Hyphantria pictipupa is a moth of the family Erebidae. It was described by Asa Fitch in 1857. It is found in Brazil.

References

Spilosomina
Moths described in 1857
Taxa named by Asa Fitch